Lotte World is a major recreation complex in Seoul, South Korea. It consists of a large indoor theme park, an outdoor amusement park called "Magic Island", an artificial island inside a lake linked by monorail, shopping malls, a luxury hotel, a Korean folk museum, sports facilities, and movie theaters. Opened on July 12, 1989, Lotte World receives 7.3 million visitors each year.

General information
Lotte World is located in Sincheon-dong, Songpa-gu, Seoul, South Korea. It is made up of two main sections, the outdoor amusement park Magic Island, and Adventure (indoors).

Lotte World is open all year long without any holiday closings and has operating hours from 9 am to 11 pm.

Opening 
Lotte World Adventure started construction in August 1984, opened at 11 a.m. on July 12, 1989, and Magic Island opened on March 24, 1990. It is located near Jamsil Station on Seoul Subway Line 2 and Seoul Subway Line 8. In the early days, there was also a market and a New Country Supermarket, but in 1990, the New Country Supermarket was absorbed by Lotte Shopping and changed its name to Lotte Department Store in Jamsil in 1998. In Seomyeon, Busan, there was Lotte World Sky Plaza, which started construction in 1992 and opened in 1996, but it was in the red due to the lack of a free pass system and annual membership system. In 1999, it was demolished due to the safety issues of the Sky Plaza and Loop. Busan Lotte World Sky Plaza has now been replaced by Lotte Cinema multiplex theaters.

The initial hours of operation were 9:30 a.m. to 8 p.m., but the hours of operation have changed from 9:30 a.m. to 11 p.m. since 1998 when marketing was conducted stating "every day until 11 p.m." Lotte World also rose 20 percent when sales at other theme parks in Korea fell about 20 percent during the IMF bailout.

There are more than 40 different kinds of amusement facilities, including Gyro Drop and Atlantis, and there are also large-scale fantasy parades at 2 p.m. and 7 p.m. every day except Monday. On December 12, 2007, the total number of visitors exceeded 100 million, and in 2012, foreign tourists accounted for 10 percent of the total. Lotte Department Store Jamsil branch and duty-free shop are also famous tourist attractions. In the Seoul metropolitan area, it is considered one of the top three entertainment facilities along with Everland and Seoul Land. In 2011, it ranked 11th in the world in number of visitors with 7.58 million visitors.

In May 2013, Lotte World Underland, a theme zone with the theme of a goblin village, was opened on the first basement floor, and 4D Shooting Theater, Media Zone, and restaurants were located in Underland as well.

In the case of Magic Island, there was a high-altitude series of high-altitude fighter jets, high-altitude parachutes and high-altitude wave rides in the 1990s, but now there are a gyro attractions consisting of Gyro Drop, Gyroswing, and Gyrospin.

Lotte World Ice Rink, which measures 36m × 65m on the third basement floor of Adventure, is a skating attraction. On the west side of Adventure was Lotte World Swimming, but it closed in 2008. KidZania, a children's vocational theme park, is also located here.

In addition, Lotte World opened the Gimhae Lotte Water Park in Jangyu-dong, Gimhae-si, Gyeongsangnam-do from 2014 to 2015. On October 14, 2014, Lotte World Aquarium was opened within Lotte World Mall in Songpa-gu, Seoul. In 2016, Lotte World Kids Park was opened in Eunpyeong Lotte Mall.

In 2021, the Busan Lotte World Magic Forest Theme Park, also known as Osiria Theme Park, will be opened at the Dongbu Mountain Tourist Complex in Gijang-gun, Busan.

Attractions

The "Adventure" part of the amusement park is divided into four main floors.

Adventure 1F: Underland
The Adventures of Sinbad

A boat ride that allows passengers to travel along with Sinbad through an underground waterway.

The Conquistador

An Intamin-made Viking ship ride. It swings back and forth, almost reaching the ceiling of Lotte World at its maximum height. The seats at the ends of the ship rise 5 more meters and 24 degrees higher than the seats towards the middle. Must be at least 110 cm to ride.

Flume Ride

A log ride consisting of a 4-seat long boat that travels through a Jurassic jungle. Former name was "the Marrakesh Express". Must be at least 110 cm to ride.

Camelot Carrousel

The merry-go-round located near the middle of Lotte World consists of 64 white horses. This is also the merry-go-round featured in South Korean drama series, Stairway to Heaven.

Giant Loop

A Larson's fireball type ride made only of one big loop. Passengers are constantly taken for 360 degree spins in a 14m-wide circular rail. The vehicle even stops while upside down. It was closed on April 21, 2019.

Drunken Basket

An Intamin drunken barrels model teacup ride that spins the individual vehicles left and right while the whole ride itself rises up and down.

3D Desperados

A wide IMAX screen theater, where the seats are in the form of a horse. The seats move in all directions in accordance with the screen image. Passengers over 120 kg or under 120 cm must sit on a coach seat.

Lotty's Kidstoria

A playground for children under age 8. This play area's theme is a fairy-tale world. Children can go barefoot to explore Cinderella's Castle, Alice in Wonderland, and other fairy-tale stories. CHhildren at most 125cm are permitted.

Treeble's Hopper

A children's ride. The children are taken up towards a tree house as they jump up and down over 6 meters. Only children between 90 cm and 120 cm are permitted.

Kids Bumper Cars

Bumper cars for children which not permitted on the Crazy Bumper Cars. Anyone over 140 cm is not permitted, unless they are accompanying a child. Children under 5 years must have an adult with them.

Swing Pang Pang

A mini version of the Teacup ride; the children get on a twirling basket. Children under 6 years have to be accompanied by an adult.

Boong Boong Car

A kid ride where the children aboard a Boong Boong Car (붕붕 in Korean is the sound a car makes) and go to save Hansel and Gretel from the witch's house. Children under 105 cm are required to be accompanied by an adult.

Brother Moon & Sister Sun

Jump into the sky with Brother Moon & Sister Sun to run away from tiger!

Lotty Train

Make your adventure taking a small train.

Eureka

Magic boats that take riders up and down while spinning around.

Jumping Fish

Explore aquatic adventures. The only way to escape from the evil shark is to jump over it.

Do you speak Beluga?

Interactive live show with Beluga.

Adventure 2F
French Revolution

A high-octane roller coaster. It rotates 360 degrees and even up to 540 degrees in some parts. The roller coaster passes through the building and is indoors, so it may feel like it might hit the building. You can also purchase photos taken while boarding at the exit. In 2017 the French Revolution's name was changed to French Revolution2 VR. Must be at least 120 cm to ride.

Bumper Car

For adults, must be at least 140 cm to ride.

Adventure 3F
Jungle Adventure

A water ride that takes passengers through the jungle. They get on a jungle boat and enter a dark cave and are taken through the rapids.

World Monorail

The monorail takes visitors through Lotte World—both inside and outside. It gives a scenic view as it goes by Adventure, then goes outside to Magic Island that sits over the Seok-Chon Lake. There are two stations, Lake Station and Adventure Station.

Adventure 4F
Aeronauts Balloon Ride

This ride in a balloon spans the majority of the indoor park. It allows visitors view Lotte World from high above.

Dynamic Theatre

This theatre shows 15-minute-long movies, while the chair vibrates along with the movie.

Animal Theatre

This production, targeted towards children, tells the story of Piggy who is in love with a Princess. The King has already chosen a fiancé for the Princess, Knight Rolo. However, Piggy eventually wins the love of the princess through the help of his animal friends.

Pharaoh's Fury

An Egyptian-themed dark ride similar to Indiana Jones Adventure ride at Disneyland.

Magic Island 

Atlantis Adventure is a steel rollercoaster and is themed to the lost city, Atlantis. It is one of the most intense rides in the park.

Gyro Drop is a new attraction coupled with VR goggles to give a simulation of a futuristic landscape during the elevation sequence. After completing a short rotation at the top, the seats will be dropped, halting to a stop at the base. One can opt out of the VR goggles if needed.

Gyro Swing is basically a giant swing similar to the indoor ride, but with a rotating end where participants are seated.

Comet Express is an indoor roller coaster with a space theme that travels through three separate rooms. Each car seats two people and rotates independently from the train.

Bungee Drop is the main bungee ride in the area.

Swing Tree is the chair swing ride in this area.

World Monorail is the monorail in this area.

Gyro Spin A Zamperla Mega Disk'o ride with 40 seats.

Fantasy Dream Fantastic underground train full of cute animals.

Metro Madness Crazy bumper cars crashing into everything.

Auto Tours Classic European cars for children.

Former Attractions 

Parachute Drop

Hydra (Waagner-Biro Tree Triple Wheel)

Barn Stormer

Eagle Fortress

Replaced by Swing Tree.

Waikiki Wave

A Vekoma top spin ride. It was located on where Gyro Spin is now.

Rad Flying Tires
A top spin ride with super fast tires to hold on to. It is located where Bumper Car is now.

Live shows 

 Magic Theatre : The « Magic Theatre » is a theatre of about 200 seats, featuring magicians and illusionists from Korea, as well as several other countries around the world. One of those was the Canadian illusionist Loran, who was featured from July to December 1997, accomplishing more than 700 performances. Loran is an international artist whose magic is hallmarked in a Medieval-Gothic style.

In popular culture
Lotte World was one of several locations used for filming the Korean drama Stairway to Heaven, namely the carousel, ice rink and as the seat of Cha Song-joo's family business.

The Korean boy band H.O.T. shot the video for their single "Candy" in Lotte World.

Lotte World was also featured on the Korean variety/reality lifestyle show Pajama Friends.

The British K-Pop girl group KAACHI filmed their music video "Get up" in Lotte World.

See also

List of South Korean tourist attractions
 Contemporary culture of South Korea
 Lotte Group
 Everland
 Seoul Land
 Children's Grand Park

References

External links
 
 Lotte World official website 

World
Buildings and structures in Songpa District
Indoor amusement parks
Amusement parks in South Korea
Amusement parks opened in 1989
Tourist attractions in Seoul
Buildings and structures in Seoul
1989 establishments in South Korea
20th-century architecture in South Korea